The 2003 Lamar Hunt U.S. Open Cup ran from June through October, 2003, open to all soccer teams in the United States.

The Chicago Fire won their 3rd Open Cup title with a 1–0 victory over the MetroStars in the final at Giants Stadium, East Rutherford, New Jersey. Chicago missed out on a domestic treble (with the Supporters' Shield) when the Fire lost MLS Cup 2003.

The Open Cup tournament was dominated by MLS squads, as only two non-MLS teams reached the quarterfinals. The Pro Select League's Wilmington Hammerheads were the story of the tournament, winning four straight games to reach the quarterfinals, including a 4-1 thrashing of MLS side Dallas Burn. The A-League's Seattle Sounders were the only other minor-league team to beat an MLS team, winning 1–0 over San Jose.

Open Cup bracket
Home teams listed on top of bracket

Schedule
Note: Scorelines use the standard U.S. convention of placing the home team on the right-hand side of box scores.

First round
Four PDL and four USASA teams start.

Second round
Six PSL and two PDL teams enter.

Third round
Eight A-League and two MLS teams enter.

Fourth round
Eight MLS teams enter.

Quarterfinals

Semifinals

Final

Top scorers

2003 domestic association football cups
2003 in American soccer
2003